Faris Touairi (born 1999) is an Algerian weightlifter. He won the gold medal in the men's 89kg event at the 2021 African Weightlifting Championships held in Nairobi, Kenya. He also set a new African record in the Snatch with a lift of 165kg.

Career 

In 2018, he competed in the men's 77kg event at the Junior World Weightlifting Championships held in Tashkent, Uzbekistan. He also competed in the men's 81kg event at the 2019 Junior World Weightlifting Championships held in Suva, Fiji.

In 2021, he won the gold medal in the men's 89kg event at the African Weightlifting Championships held in Nairobi, Kenya. He also set a new African record in the Snatch with a lift of 165kg. He competed in the men's 89kg event at the 2021 World Weightlifting Championships held in Tashkent, Uzbekistan. He won the bronze medal in the men's 89kg Snatch event at the 2022 Mediterranean Games held in Oran, Algeria.

Achievements

References

External links 
 

Living people
1999 births
Place of birth missing (living people)
Algerian male weightlifters
African Weightlifting Championships medalists
Competitors at the 2022 Mediterranean Games
Mediterranean Games bronze medalists for Algeria
Mediterranean Games medalists in weightlifting
21st-century Algerian people